Logrow is an unincorporated community in Brooke County, West Virginia, United States.

Logrow was named for a grove of locust trees near the original town site, according to local history.

References 

Unincorporated communities in West Virginia
Unincorporated communities in Brooke County, West Virginia